Alexa Skye Swinton is an American actress, singer and songwriter. She appeared in a lead role as Piper in the 13-episode ABC prime time series called Emergence, has a recurring role as Eva Rhoades in Billions, and the HBO series And Just Like That..., where she plays the character of Rose Goldenblatt. She appeared in M. Night Shyamalan's Old, playing the role of Young Maddox.

Career 
Swinton originated the role of Addie in Make Believe, written by Bess Wohl, and directed by Jackson Gay at the Hartford Stage. Swinton's first leading role in television was as Piper in Emergence. The show ran for 13 episodes from 2019 to 2020. She first performed her original song "You, Me and My Purple Docs" publicly on Canadian TV station CHCH-DT in Hamilton, Ontario. Swinton has a recurring role as Eva Rhoades, the daughter of main characters Chuck and Wendy Rhoades in Showtime’s television drama Billions. She acted in M. Night Shyamalan's feature film Old playing the role of Young Maddox.

She plays the recurring role of Rock Goldenblatt, child of Charlotte York Goldenblatt in the HBO series And Just Like That... Swinton's role has been called "groundbreaking".

Filmography

Film

Television 
{| class="wikitable"
!Year
!Title
!Role
!Notes
|-
|2012
|Mythos
|Ellie
|4 Episodes
|-
|2014
|Zach Fox Show
|Kid Playing with Toy
|
|-
|2015
|Flesh and Bone
|Young Claire
|Scorched Earth
|-
|2015
|Today
|Badly Behaving Child
|Rossen Reports
|-
|2015
|The View
|Herself
|Modeling appearance
|-
|2016
|Saturday Night Live
|Daughter of Big Family
|Selena Gomez Guest Host
|-
|2016-2021
|Billions
|Eva Rhoades
|Appears in multiple episodes each season
|-
|2017
|Saturday Night Live|Girl in Immigration Line
|Alec Baldwin Guest Host
|-
|2018
|The Tonight Show|Punk Kid
|Ice Cube / Dale Earnhardt Jr. 
|-
|2019
|Manifest|Chloe
|Upgrade
|-
|2019-2020
|Emergence|Piper
|Series appeared on ABC television in the USA and other networks around the world including CTV in Canada.
|-
|2021-
|And Just Like That...|Rock Goldenblatt
|8 Episodes
|}

 Theater 

 Discography 

 Studio recording

 You, Me and My Purple Docs (2020)
 Happy As I Wanna Be (2021)
 What Would I Change It To'' (2022)

References

External links 
 Alexa Swinton on IMDB
 Alexa Swinton on ABC
 Instagram
 Facebook
 Twitter
 YouTube
 LinkedIn
 TikTok
 Website

American child actresses
Living people
21st-century American actresses
2009 births
21st-century American women singers
21st-century American singers
Actresses from New York City
Singers from New York City